Tewitfield is a hamlet in Lancashire, England, near Borwick and Carnforth, and in the parish of Priest Hutton.

History & details 
Tewitfield Locks is the current terminus of the navigable Lancaster Canal. In 2008, the Lancaster Canal Trust, the Northern Reaches Restoration Group and others were campaigning for the re-opening of the Canal to its original terminus at Kendal, Cumbria. This would involve, among other things, refurbishing the seven locks situated just north of the hamlet, which are without gates and functioning only as weirs.

Villages in Lancashire
Geography of the City of Lancaster
Lancaster Canal